Ferry is a 2021 Belgo-Dutch film directed by Cecilia Verheyden, written by Nico Moolenaar and Bart Uytdenhouwen and starring Frank Lammers, Elise Schaap and Huub Stapel. The film serves as a prequel to the Netflix series Undercover.

Cast 
 Frank Lammers as Ferry Bouman
 Elise Schaap as Danielle van Marken
 Huub Stapel as Ralph Brink
 Raymond Thiry as John Zwart
 Monic Hendrickx as Claudia Zwart-Bouman
 Huub Smit as Dennis de Vries
 Juliette van Ardenne as Keesje Bouwman

References

External links
 
 

2021 films
2021 crime drama films
Dutch crime drama films
Belgian crime drama films
Dutch-language Netflix original films
2020s Dutch-language films
Films set in Amsterdam